The Little Humboldt River is a tributary of the Humboldt River, approximately  long, in northern Nevada in the western United States.  It is an intermittent stream draining a rugged area on the edge of the Owyhee Desert in the Great Basin.

It rises in two forks in northern Nevada. The North Fork (45 mi/72 km) rises in northeastern Humboldt County, on the northeast end of the Santa Rosa Range, and flows intermittently to the ESE along the southeast edge of the Owyhee Desert. The South Fork (40 mi/64 km) rises in extreme western Elko County north of Jake Creek Mountain and generally flows WNW.

It is impounded to form Chimney Dam Reservoir near the confluence of its forks in eastern Humboldt County.  The river has recently been the subject of environmental controversies regarding charges of overgrazing on the federal lands surrounding the river.

Tributaries of the Humboldt River
Rivers of Nevada
Rivers of Humboldt County, Nevada
Rivers of the Great Basin